Méguet is a department or commune of Ganzourgou Province in central-eastern Burkina Faso. Its capital lies at the town of Méguet. According to the 1996 census the department has a total population of 34,668.

Towns and villages

 Méguet (7 273 inhabitants) (capital)
 Baghin	(1 112 inhabitants)
 Bollé	(1 100 inhabitants)
 Boulwando	(1 710 inhabitants)
 Dazanré	(783 inhabitants)
 Kabouda	(1 498 inhabitants)
 Kakim	(333 inhabitants)
 Kanré	(1 743 inhabitants)
 Kougdoughin	(1 318 inhabitants)
 Koulweogo	(2 113 inhabitants)
 Lalmogo	(524 inhabitants)
 Nahoubé	(1 095 inhabitants)
 Ouavoussé	(1 143 inhabitants)
 Pimalga	(940 inhabitants)
 Pinré	(2 023 inhabitants)
 Tamasgo	(1 744 inhabitants)
 Tanghin	(2 902 inhabitants)
 Tibin	(1 753 inhabitants)
 Vagma	(1 213 inhabitants)
 Yama	(212 inhabitants)
 Zemalga	(2 093 inhabitants)

References

Departments of Burkina Faso
Ganzourgou Province